Saint-Péray is a commune in the Ardèche department in the Auvergne-Rhône-Alpes region in southern France.

Population

See also
 Château de Crussol, located on the territory of the commune.
Communes of the Ardèche department

References

Communes of Ardèche
Ardèche communes articles needing translation from French Wikipedia